George Alec Effinger (January 10, 1947 – April 27, 2002) was an American science fiction author, born in Cleveland, Ohio.

Writing career
Effinger was a part of the Clarion class of 1970 and had three stories in the first Clarion anthology. His first published story was "The Eight-Thirty to Nine Slot" in Fantastic in 1971. During his early period, he also published under a variety of pseudonyms.

His first novel, What Entropy Means to Me (1972), was nominated for the Nebula Award. He achieved his greatest success with the trilogy of Marîd Audran novels set in a 22nd-century Middle East, with cybernetic implants and modules allowing individuals to change their personalities or bodies. The novels are in fact set in a thinly veiled version of the French Quarter of New Orleans. The three published novels were When Gravity Fails (1987), A Fire in the Sun (1989), and The Exile Kiss (1991); Effinger also contributed to the computer game Circuit's Edge (1990), based on When Gravity Fails. He began a fourth Budayeen novel, Word of Night, but completed only the first two chapters. Those two chapters were reprinted in the anthology  Budayeen Nights (2003) which has all of Effinger's short material from the Marîd Audran setting.

His novelette "Schrödinger's Kitten" (1988) received both the Hugo and the Nebula Award, as well as the Japanese Seiun Award. A collection of his stories was published posthumously in 2005, entitled George Alec Effinger Live! From Planet Earth; includes the complete stories Effinger wrote under the pseudonym "O. Niemand" and many of Effinger's best-known stories. Each O. Niemand story is a pastiche in the voice of a different major American writer (Flannery O'Connor, Damon Runyon, Mark Twain, etc.), all set on the asteroid city of Springfield. "Niemand" is from the German word for "nobody", and the initial O was intended by Effinger as a visual pun for Zero, and possibly also as a reference to the author O. Henry.

Other stories he wrote were the series of Maureen (Muffy) Birnbaum parodies, which placed a preppy into a variety of science fictional, fantasy, and horror scenarios.

He made brief forays into writing comic books in the early 1970s, mostly in Marvel Comics' science fiction, fantasy, and horror titles; and again in the late 1980s, including the first issue of a series of his own creation entitled Neil and Buzz in Space & Time, about two fictional astronauts who travel to the edge of the universe to find it contains nothing but an ocean planet with a replica of a small New Jersey town on its only island. The first issue was the only issue, and the story ended on a cliffhanger. It was released by Fantagraphics.  He also wrote a story based in the Zork universe.

Personal life
Effinger was known to close friends as "Piglet", a nickname from his youth which he later came to dislike.

Throughout his life, Effinger suffered from health problems.  These resulted in enormous medical bills which he was unable to pay, resulting in a declaration of bankruptcy. Because Louisiana's system of law descends from the Napoleonic Code rather than English Common Law, the possibility existed that copyrights to Effinger's works and characters might revert to his creditors, in this case the hospital. However, no representative of the hospital showed up at the bankruptcy hearing, and Effinger regained the rights to all his intellectual property.

Effinger suffered a hearing loss of about 70% due to childhood infections, only helped about the last 10 years of his life by hearing aids. He did not drive most of his life, and only got a driver's license at about age 39 for check-cashing purposes.

Effinger met his first wife Diana in the 1960s. He was married from the mid-1970s to the mid-1980s to artist Beverly K. Effinger, and from 1998 to 2000 to fellow science fiction author Barbara Hambly. He died in New Orleans, Louisiana.

Works

Novels (non-series)
 What Entropy Means to Me (1972)
 Relatives (1973)
 Nightmare Blue (1975) (with Gardner Dozois)
 Felicia (1976)
 Those Gentle Voices: A Promethean Romance of the Spaceways (1976)
 Death in Florence (1978) (aka Utopia 3)
 Heroics (1979)
 The Wolves of Memory (1981)
 Shadow Money (1988)
 The Red Tape War (1990) (with Mike Resnick and Jack L. Chalker)
 The Zork Chronicles (1990)
 Look Away (1990) (novella)
 Schrödinger's Kitten (1992)
 Trinity: Hope Sacrifice Unity
 The League of Dragons: A Castle Falkenstein Novel (1998)

Nick of Time series
 The Nick of Time (1985)
 The Bird of Time (1986)

Marîd Audran series
 When Gravity Fails (1987)
 A Fire in the Sun (1989)
 The Exile Kiss (1991)
 The Audran Sequence (omnibus)
 Budayeen Nights (short stories, 2003)

Planet of the Apes Television series adaptations
 Man the Fugitive  (1974)
 Escape to Tomorrow (1975)
 Journey Into Terror  (1975)
 Lord of the Apes (1976)

Collections
 Mixed Feelings (1974)
 Irrational Numbers (1976)
 Dirty Tricks (1978)
 Idle Pleasures (1983) (science fiction sports stories)
 Author's Choice Monthly Issue 1: The Old Funny Stuff (1989)
 Maureen Birnbaum, Barbarian Swordsperson (1993)
 George Alec Effinger Live! From Planet Earth (2005)
 stories selected and introduced by friends, fellow writers and editors
 A Thousand Deaths (2007)
 the novel The Wolves of Memory plus 7 additional Sandor Courane stories (6 uncollected)

Short stories
 "The First Step," (as John K. Diomede) Haunt of Horror (digest) #1 (Marvel, June 1973)
 "The Jewel in the Ash," (as John K. Diomede) Haunt of Horror (digest) #2 (Marvel, August 1973)
 "Heartstop," Haunt of Horror (magazine) #1 (Marvel, May 1974)
 "And Us, Too, I Guess" (novella) (collected in Chains of the Sea, published 1974)
 "Prince Pat" (1992) (collected in Mike Resnick's alternate history anthology Alternate Kennedys) 
 "Albert Schweitzer and the Treasures of Atlantis" (1993) (collected in Mike Resnick's alternate history anthology Alternate Warriors)
 "Shootout at Gower Gulch" (1994) (collected in Mike Resnick's alternate history anthology Alternate Outlaws) 
 "Mars: The Home Front" (1996)
 "The Last Full Measure"

 Comics 
 "Wasteland—on a Weirdling World" (featuring Gullivar Jones, Warrior of Mars), Creatures on the Loose #18 (Marvel, July 1972)
 "The Long Road to Nowhere" (featuring Gullivar Jones), Creatures on the Loose #19 (Marvel, September 1972)
 "Moon of Madness, Moon of Fear!", Chamber of Chills #1 (Marvel, November 1972)
 "What Price Victory?" (featuring Gullivar Jones), Creatures on the Loose #20 (Marvel, November 1972)
 "More Than Blood!", Journey into Mystery #2 (Marvel, December 1972)
 "Two Worlds to Win!" (featuring Gullivar Jones), Creatures on the Loose #21 (Marvel, January 1973)
 "All the Shapes of Fear!", Chamber of Chills #3 (Marvel, March 1973)
 "Thongor! Warrior of Lost Lemuria!" (featuring Thongor! Warrior of Lost Lemuria!), Creatures on the Loose #22 (Marvel, March 1973)
 "Where Broods the Demon!" (featuring Thongor), Creatures on the Loose #23 (Marvel, May 1973)
 "Red Swords, Black Wings!" (featuring Thongor), Creatures on the Loose #24 (Marvel, July 1973)
 "The Wizard of Lemuria!" (featuring Thongor), Creatures on the Loose #25 (Marvel, September 1973)
 "The Mouse Alone!" (featuring the Young Gray Mouser), Sword of Sorcery #5 (DC Comics, Nov.-Dec. 1973)
 "More Than Blood!" in Doomsday  #17 (K. G. Murray, July 1974)
 "All the World Wars at Once!", Fantastic Four #161 (Marvel, August 1975) 
 Neil and Buzz in Space and Time #1 (Fantagraphics, April 1989)

Note: The titles of the first two books of the Marîd Audran series are both taken from Bob Dylan lyrics. "When Gravity Fails" is from the song "Just Like Tom Thumb's Blues" and "A Fire in the Sun" from "It's All Over Now, Baby Blue".  Permission was denied to use a Dylan quote again for the third book's title, so Effinger chose instead a public domain quote from Shakespeare.

References
Notes

Sources

External links

 Effinger on Science Fiction & Fantasy Writers of America site
 List of his publications on FantasticFiction.co.uk
 Tribute page that includes FAQ
 

1947 births
2002 deaths
20th-century American novelists
American male novelists
American science fiction writers
Hugo Award-winning writers
Nebula Award winners
Writers from Cleveland
Novelists from Ohio
20th-century American male writers